The Ohio 250 was a NASCAR Craftsman Truck Series race that was held at Mansfield Motorsports Park on Memorial Day weekend between 2004 and 2008.

History
The 2006 race saw 18 caution flags flown during the race, setting a series record. Dennis Setzer won the 2007 race without making a fuel stop, which took place with a 22-gallon fuel cell.  This race took over seven hours to run due to three rain delays and was the final Craftsman Truck Series victory for Spears Motorsports, who ceased operations following the 2007 season.

The 2008 edition was won by Donny Lia, who became the first rookie in nearly five seasons to win a Craftsman Truck Series race. The race was formerly known as the UAW/GM Ohio 250.  General Motors operated a plant in Mansfield and a number of its residents used to work there.  Appropriately, Chevrolet has won four of the five races, with Bobby Hamilton giving Dodge its only Mansfield victory in 2005. NASCAR announced it will not return to Mansfield for 2009, replacing the race with one to be held at Iowa Speedway.

Past winners

2004 and 2005: Race extended due to a green–white–checker finish; 2005 marked Hamilton's last NASCAR win before his death in early 2007.

Manufacturer wins

References

External links
 

Former NASCAR races
NASCAR Truck Series races
United Auto Workers
General Motors